The Echoing Green: The Untold Story of Bobby Thomson, Ralph Branca and the Shot Heard Round the World is a nonfiction book written by Joshua Prager and originally published by Pantheon Books in 2006. 
The book centers on the 1951 New York Giants scheme to read opposing catchers' finger signals relayed from catcher to pitcher with a telescope in the center-field clubhouse during the latter part of the 1951 Major League Baseball season. This led to baseball's famous  Shot Heard 'Round the World, when Bobby Thomson hit a three-run homer in the bottom of the ninth inning against Brooklyn Dodgers pitcher Ralph Branca, resulting in winning the three game playoff series and the National League (NL) pennant, with a 5-4 win over the Dodgers.   "It's been described as the greatest baseball game ever played, and you don't have to be a baseball fan to mark the anniversary." The book expands on an article that Prager wrote in 2001 for the Wall Street Journal.

Background

2001 Wall Street Journal article
Joshua Prager originally wrote about the signal stealing scheme in a 2001 Wall Street Journal article entitled "Was the '51 Giants Comeback a Miracle, Or Did They Simply Steal the Pennant?"

Tie-breaker series

The 1951 National League tie-breaker series was a best-of-three playoff series at the conclusion of Major League Baseball's (MLB) 1951 regular season to decide the winner of the National League (NL) pennant. The games were played on October 1, 2, and 3, 1951, between the New York Giants and Brooklyn Dodgers. It was necessary after both teams finished the season with identical win–loss records of 96–58. It is most famous for the walk-off home run hit by Bobby Thomson of the Giants in the deciding game, which has come to be known as baseball's "Shot Heard 'Round the World". Consequently, the Giants advanced to the 1951 World Series, in which they were defeated by the New York Yankees. In baseball statistics, the tie-breaker series counted as the 155th, 156th, and 157th regular season games by both teams; all events in the games were added to regular season statistics." The Dodgers rebounded to win the National League pennant in 1952, but lost the 1952 World Series to the Yankees four games to three. Thomson's dramatic three-run homer came in the ninth inning of the decisive third game of a three-game playoff for the pennant in which the Giants trailed, 4–1.

References

External links
Publisher's book page
Giants Stole the Pennant! Giants Stole the Pennant! Los Angeles Times. February 2001. Retrieved November 24, 2019
Focus on the Giants’ Cheating Scandal of 1951. Society for American Baseball Research. 2015. Retrieved November 24, 2019

Major League Baseball books
2006 non-fiction books
Cheating in sports
Pantheon Books books